Athletics at the 1988 Summer Paralympics consisted of 344 events. Because of ties for third place in the men's 800 metre A1–3/A9/L2 and precision throw C1 events, a total of 346 bronze medals were awarded. Because of a tie for first place in the women's 100 m 5–6 345 gold medals and 343 silver medals were awarded. Bulgaria, Puerto Rico, South Korea, Thailand and Tunisia won their first ever medals in this sport.

Participating nations

Medal summary

Medal table

Men's events

Women's events

Mixed events

References 

 

 
1988 Summer Paralympics events
1988
Paralympics